This article is about historical Fixtures & Results for the Great Britain men's national field hockey team because the main page should only include recent Fixtures & Results.

The Great Britain men's national field hockey team represents the United Kingdom in Olympic field hockey tournaments. The team won gold at the 1920 Summer Olympics in Antwerp and the 1988 Summer Olympics in Seoul. The team won the 2017 Sultan Azlan Shah Cup.

These are the results from 2017 to 2020:

Fixtures & Results

2020 Fixtures & Results

2020-21 Men's FIH Pro League

2019 Fixtures & Results

2019 Men's FIH Pro League

Test Matches

FIH Olympic Qualifiers

2018 Fixtures & Results

Test Matches

2017 Fixtures & Results

Sultan Azlan Shah Cup

Test Matches

See also
Great Britain men's national field hockey team
Great Britain women's national field hockey team
England men's national hockey team
Ireland men's national field hockey team
Scotland men's national field hockey team
Wales men's national field hockey team

References

Field hockey